The 1996 Schweppes Tasmanian International was a women's tennis tournament played on outdoor hard courts at the Hobart International Tennis Centre in Hobart in Australia that was part of Tier IV of the 1996 WTA Tour. It was the third edition of the tournament and was held from 8 through 14 January 1996. Unseeded Julie Halard-Decugis won the singles title.

Headers

Singles

 Julie Halard-Decugis defeated  Mana Endo 6–1, 6–2
 It was Halard-Decugis' 2nd title of the year and the 8th of her career.

Doubles

 Yayuk Basuki /  Kyoko Nagatsuka defeated  Kerry-Anne Guse /  Sung-Hee Park 7–6, 6–3
 It was Basuki's 1st title of the year and the 10th of her career. It was Nagatsuka's only title of the year and the 2nd of her career.

References

External links
 ITF tournament edition details

 
Schweppes Tasmanian International
Tas
Hobart International